Glyphipterix luteocapitella is a species of sedge moth in the genus Glyphipterix. It was described by Aristide Caradja in 1926. It is found in Russia (Amur).

References

Moths described in 1926
Glyphipterigidae
Moths of Asia